Joseph Emilien Clifford "Red" Goupille (September 2, 1915 – July 4, 2005) was a Canaidan ice hockey player who played 224 games in the National Hockey League with the Montreal Canadiens between 1936 and 1942.

Career statistics

Regular season and playoffs

External links
 

1915 births
2005 deaths
Canadian ice hockey defencemen
Hull Volants players
Ice hockey people from Quebec
Montreal Canadiens players
New Haven Eagles players
Sherbrooke Saints players
Sportspeople from Trois-Rivières